The title Movie War is used for Kamen Rider films which feature crossovers between TV series. Each film features characters from the series that is airing at the time and the previous one:

List of films